María Pérez Marcano (born April 1, 1989) is a Puerto Rican judoka.

She competed at the 2016 Summer Olympics in Rio de Janeiro, in the women's 70 kg. She also competed in the women's 70 kg event at the 2020 Summer Olympics in Tokyo, Japan.

In 2020, she won the silver medal in the women's 70 kg event at the 2020 Pan American Judo Championships held in Guadalajara, Mexico.

References

External links

1989 births
Living people
Puerto Rican female judoka
Olympic judoka of Puerto Rico
Judoka at the 2016 Summer Olympics
Pan American Games medalists in judo
Pan American Games bronze medalists for Cuba
People from Carolina, Puerto Rico
Judoka at the 2011 Pan American Games
Judoka at the 2019 Pan American Games
Central American and Caribbean Games gold medalists for Puerto Rico
Central American and Caribbean Games silver medalists for Puerto Rico
Competitors at the 2010 Central American and Caribbean Games
Central American and Caribbean Games medalists in judo
Medalists at the 2011 Pan American Games
Medalists at the 2019 Pan American Games
Judoka at the 2020 Summer Olympics
21st-century Puerto Rican women